The Sigsbee Deep (Mexico basin in the U. S. Board on Geographic Names Advisory Committee on Undersea Features (ACUF) Gazetteer), is a roughly triangular basin that is the deepest part of the Gulf of Mexico named for Commander Charles Dwight Sigsbee, USN, Assistant U. S. Coast and Geodetic Survey, commanding officer of the USC&GS George S. Blake which discovered the feature during its mapping of the Gulf of Mexico. As described below there is some confusion of names that apply to the basin or a particular point in the basin with both being found in technical and popular literature applying to both basin and the coordinates.

Description 

The Sigsbee Abyssal Plain is the deepest and flattest sector of the deep basin.

Name/Location differences 

The use of "Sigsbee" for the feature originates from Commander Charles Dwight Sigsbee's Gulf of Mexico surveys that defined the general features of the body while commanding officer of the USC&GS George S. Blake. "Sigsbee Deep" applied to the entire deep basin appears on some of the earliest charts of the Gulf of Mexico.

Sigsbee Deep is a variant name for the United States Board on Geographic Names (BGN) approved name of Mexico Basin for cartographic materials produced by Federal agencies. A proposal by the United States renaming Sigsbee Deep, with coordinates of 23° 52′ N 91° 35′ W, to "Mexico basin" was rejected by the Sixteenth Meeting of the GEBCO Sub-committee on Undersea Feature Names (SCUFN), the international authority on feature names, in 2003 with the note that it is "an historical name dating back to Sir John Murray." The committee discussion of the United States nomination Mexico Basin as having the exact coordinates of 23° 52′ N 91° 35′ W as the Sigsbee Deep under consideration noted the Mexico Basin is in the GEBCO Gazetteer with coordinates of 22° 30′ N 95° 00′ W to 25° 00′ N 90° 00′ W. The issue appears to be one of the entire basin or a particular point within the basin for application of the names. The United States' proposal to rename the 23° 52′ N 91° 35′ W point "Mexico basin was rejected while the ACUF Mexico basin with "Sigsbee deep" as an alternate name is given in the NGA database as 25° N 92° W.

There are other features with BGN approved names in the region in recognition of this pioneer in deep ocean sounding and commander of the first true bathymetric survey of the Gulf of Mexico conducted while commanding USC&GS George S. Blake:
 Sigsbee Plain - 23° 30′ 00″ N 093° 00′ 00″ W
 Sigsbee Knolls - 23° 45′ 00″ N 092° 25′ 00″ W
 Sigsbee Escarpment - 26° 00′ 00″ N 092° 30′ 00″ W

Notes

References

External links 
 Deep Sea Drilling Project: Leg 10 of the Glomar Challenger
 GULF OF MEXICO SEAFLOOR

Landforms of the Gulf of Mexico
Oceanic basins of the Atlantic Ocean
Abyssal plains